Lightwater Valley Family Adventure Park is a theme park in North Stainley, North Yorkshire, England. The park was once home to Europe's longest roller coaster, The Ultimate.

Lightwater Valley was founded by Robert Staveley in 1969, and is now owned and operated by The Brighton Pier Group, having been purchased by them for £5 million in 2021.

The park features approximately 30 rides and attracts approximately 300,000 visitors per year.

Park information

History

In 1969, Lightwater Valley began as a small self-pick fruit farm attraction. The farm was owned by the Staveley family, who had owned the land since 1516. In 1976, the farm was affected by drought, resulting in the excavation of a lake to help reduce the effects of future droughts. The lake's popularity instigated the transition of the farm into a tourist attraction. Early attractions included an adventure playground (later Fort William), canoes, rowing boats and a circus. Later on, Staveley introduced a petting zoo, BMX bikes, Go Karts, a pitch and putt golf course, a hell slide and a water chute ('Devil's Cascade', later re-themed to 'Toad Hole'). During this time, the park was advertised as a country park and self-pick fruit farm with a pay-one-price and ride-all-day system in place, with the exception of a small number of pay-to-play attractions. A range of different fairground rides were introduced into the entrance areas of the park and the Lightwater Shopping Village was established.

The Lightwater Valley Theme Park was born when the Rat Ride was built in 1987. Robert Staveley wanted to expand on the family market and provide something for the thrill market, whilst still catering for a younger audience. At the time, Robert Staveley's wife was a keen protector of the country park status and did not like the idea of having a roller coaster spoiling this. After much discussion, she permitted the construction of a roller coaster as long as it was out of sight. To accommodate his wife's wishes, Robert decided that he would bury the roller coaster underground and it became based on the dwellings of a sewer rat. The ride closed in 2009 for refurbishment and re-opened as Raptor Attack for the 2010 season. The ride was constructed by blasting large amounts of rock (which was sold) and capping the hole and exposed sides with a large barn style building. The ride attracted much attention, nearly doubling gate figures and paving the way for future developments including the park's first looping coaster, the Soopa Loopa, in 1988 which featured two vertical loops and a backward facing ride car.

Following the success of the Rat Ride, Robert Staveley persuaded his wife that a 'proper' roller coaster be built. He liked the idea of having a roller coaster coming down the valley at the top of the park, but was faced with the challenge of getting people to the top of the valley to board the train. His wife suggested that the train be sent out to the top and then returned with the aid of two drops. The Ultimate was opened to the public in 1991.

Additional rides and attractions were added throughout the decade, including roller coasters such as The Viper, The Batflyer, and The Ladybird. Water rides such as the Beaver Rapids log flume and Splash Falls were opened. A number of rides, including the Beaver Rapids and the Heatwave, were opened on short-term leases instead of being purchased.

Change of ownership
In the mid-1990s, Robert Staveley handed the park over to his children, Amanda and James. However, in 1997, there was a change of ownership from a private family firm to Queensborough Holdings, who bought the park for £5.2 million. The park was sold because it had run into financial difficulties following the heavy expenditure on The Ultimate.

Queensborough Holdings was also in ownership of the Pleasurewood Hills Theme Park at the time. Both parks were operated by Leisure Great Britain, part of Queensborough Holdings. However, the new owners put the park back up for sale within 11 months of buying it, deciding instead to refocus their business. No bid was accepted during the following few years. Lightwater Valley was given a new lease of life in February 2001 when the park was bought by Ball Investments who used Heritage GB to manage the operations.

The new ownership brought about rapid investment in ride offerings and brand imaging with new logos, mascots, websites and rides such as The Treetop Twister and Black Widow's Web in the first year, followed by rides such as The Octopus, The Eagle's Claw, The Grizzly Bear, The Caterpillar Coaster, Trauma Tower and Skyrider.

Following the unfortunate incidents of 2001, guest figures plummeted from their 1990 averages. Continual improvements to the family offering, brand imaging and marketing have resulted in vast improvements to customer satisfaction and attendance figures. Some of these improvements included: investment in the re-theming of the Sewer Rat to Raptor Attack, the introduction of the first themed 'area', 'Skeleton Cove', with five new rides (bought from the now defunct Loudoun Castle park in Scotland) along with new family friendly attractions such as the Angry Birds Activity Park, Eagles Creek Farm, the Vintage Car Rally and Jurassic mini golf course. Successful events such as the ever-popular annual Frightwater Valley Halloween event, Pirates & Princesses weekend, and UK bungee jump days have attracted record gate figures.

During the late 2000s, talk began of the potential development of Lightwater Resorts. Initial planning permission for holiday caravans and log cabins was rejected by Harrogate Borough Council due to concerns about the impact on traffic and local businesses. The park later re-designed and re-submitted their planning permission for 106 log cabins which was then granted.

In June 2017, the park was sold to attractions operator Livingstone Leisure Ltd for an undisclosed amount.

After Livingstone Leisure Ltd bought the park, the decision was made to close the Lightwater Country Shopping Village at the end of the 2017 season.

The Bird Of Prey Centre was closed at the end of the 2018 season and did not return for 2019.

In 2021 the park announced it would be re-calibrating its attraction offering by focussing on the younger family audience. A number of older thrill rides were retired and new rides suited to younger children introduced. The Ultimate remained closed for the 2020 and 2021 seasons and a decision made to dismantle the ride in 2023.

In June 2021, the park was sold to The Brighton Pier Group for £5 million. Chief executive Anne Ackord states, ‘I believe that, together, we can develop Lightwater Valley into the premier amusement destination across Yorkshire and the surrounding areas.’

The park received a major rebrand for the 2022 season, with a new logo, new mascot and name change to 'Lightwater Valley Family Adventure Park'.

Rides and attractions
Lightwater Valley has over 40 rides and attractions, ranging from thrill rides such as Eagles Claw and Splash Falls, to small rides designed for children such as Dragon Boats.

Attractions Key

Fairground

Go Safari

Skeleton Cove

Top Thrills

Lakeside

Eagles Creek

Discovery Woods

Dino-Roar Adventures

Park Mascots
Under Queensborough Holding's ownership, the park had a single mascot, Woody the Bear. In 2001, Ball Investments introduced the Valligators to the park. The Valligators were three green alligator-costumed entertainers who acted as the park's mascots named Harry, Sally and Baby Al.  In 2017, Livingstone Leisure replaced the Valligators with two new dinosaur mascots called Jester and Jasmine. From 2022, new owners Brighton Pier Leisure Group introduced Ebor the Dragon and the next season in 2023, Rex the Valleysaurus.

Incidents
On 21 June 2001, 20-year-old Gemma Savage died following an accident the previous day when two carriages collided on Treetop Twister, a spinning Wild Mouse roller coaster, which had opened in May of that year. Police decided not to prosecute a maintenance worker, who claimed that he had only received an hour of training on the ride and had not seen its manual. Faulty wiring had also caused a malfunction on the ride. In October 2004, Deputy Coroner John Sleightholme at Skipton Magistrates' Court ruled death by misadventure.

Lightwater Valley's owners and electrician Eric Butters admitted to breaching health and safety laws at Leeds Crown Court on 14 November 2006. Lightwater Valley Attractions Ltd was charged with failing to ensure the health and safety of riders. Butters was charged with failing to ensure safety through his work. Both pleaded guilty. A French manufacturer, Reverchon Industries SA, was convicted of two charges of failing to ensure the ride's safe design and construction.

In May 2019, a young boy fell 30 ft from The Twister and was left in critical condition. The ride was sold to a UK based showman at the end of the 2019 season. The park was fined £350,000 for health and safety breaches.

Energy efficiency
In 2015, the park reported energy efficiency savings of around £130,000 a year stemming from an investment in renewable technologies. These include new carbon-neutral biomass boilers producing 400 kW per unit, enabling the park to move away from the conventional oil-based heating system. In addition, a new ground-mounted photovoltaic array was installed in the adjacent fields, which has supplied up to 45% of the park's energy demand.  Much of the rest of the energy demand for the rides, including The Ultimate, is met by means of diesel generators.

Past attractions

The Ultimate

The Ultimate was designed by Big Country Motioneering (BCM) and the park's original owner, Robert Staveley. Construction began in early 1990, taking 18 months to complete. The ride's Canadian redwood trestles and large station building were constructed by Staveley's in-house construction team, which was responsible for building Lightwater Valley's other buildings. The metal track work was ordered from BCM who used fabricators 'Tubular Engineering' to manufacture it. However, much of the installation was largely undertaken in-house and supervised by engineers from British Rail after BCM were sacked due to track problems and slow progress. The scale of the project led to both contracted companies going bankrupt halfway through its construction, leaving Staveley's team and British Rail to finish the project on their own. Staveley got assistance from American and German roller coaster manufacturers, who advised him to ensure that there was enough flexibility in the track to allow for expansion and contraction under fluctuating temperatures. Overall, the project was over a year behind schedule and went significantly over budget. Staveley wanted to ensure that he was the first to ride his creation well in advance of its opening in order to give himself time to improve and re-work areas of track. He did so by riding in one of the trains that had not yet been fitted with any restraints, using only rope to secure himself.

The ride was opened on 17 July 1991 by Frank Bruno. Initially, Staveley had not set out to break any records and it was only once construction had gotten underway that a colleague exclaimed that there couldn't be a roller coaster longer than the one they were building. Later that day, a colleague was sent to Ripon to buy the Guinness Book of Records, which confirmed that the length of track that Staveley had ordered was well over the record. The Ultimate has two trains, which have both been reverted to the original navy blue colour after serving 17 years as red and blue. The trains also used to have over-the-shoulder restraints until 1992 when they were removed and replaced with lap bar restraints to improve the ride experience.

A number of modifications had to be made following the ride's opening. After a season of operation, a significant number of the bogies and wheels had cracks in them, resulting in subsequent replacement and strengthening. The wheels were found to be getting too hot so larger wheels had to be fitted instead. One of the trains suffered from a wheel collapse on one of the train car chassis, resulting in minor injuries as the train coasted to a gradual stop.

In 2016, Lightwater Valley celebrated 25 years of The Ultimate.

The Ultimate did not operate during the 2020 season and remained closed throughout 2021. Following their takeover of the park, The Brighton Pier Group’s Chief Executive stated, ‘The Ultimate is not dead in the water. It needs some work doing on it, but we are more than conscious of its iconic status. If we can do something with it, then we will. Obviously, safety has got to be the priority, so in due course, we will have a look at it and make sure it complies with modern standards. It is quite unique. There are options to shorten it a little bit or to change its track. You wouldn’t want something that large in your back garden and not be able to use it, would you?’

The park confirmed on the 11th January 2023 that the ride would be dismantled citing prohibitive costs in updating the ride. The process of dismantling and scrapping the ride began in February 2023.

Gallery

References

Amusement parks in England
Tourist attractions in North Yorkshire
1969 establishments in England
Buildings and structures in North Yorkshire